The Stringed Instruments Museum in Portuguese: Museu dos Cordofones is located in Tebosa, in the surroundings of the city of Braga, Portugal dedicated to traditional Portuguese string instruments.

The collection features Portuguese instruments from the Middle Ages through to modern times, some have fallen into disuse.

In the exhibit are Cavaquinhos, Portuguese guitars, Mandolins, banjos among others.

The museum opened in 1995.

See also 
 List of music museums

Museums in Braga
Musical instrument museums
Museums established in 1995
Portuguese musical instruments
Music organisations based in Portugal